The Polka King is an American biographical comedy film directed by Maya Forbes and written by Forbes and Wallace Wolodarsky. The film is about real-life Polish-American polka band leader Jan Lewan, who was imprisoned in 2004 for running a Ponzi scheme. The film stars Jack Black as Lewan, as well as Jenny Slate, Jason Schwartzman, and Jacki Weaver. It premiered at the 2017 Sundance Film Festival on January 22, 2017. It was released on Netflix on January 12, 2018.

The Polka King is based on a 2009 documentary about Lewan, The Man Who Would Be Polka King, directed by Joshua Brown and John Mikulak.

Plot 
The film opens at a performance of Jan Lewan's (Black) polka band in Pennsylvania. Near the close of the show, he brings his wife Marla (Slate) onstage. A former beauty queen, Marla models amber jewelry they sell at their souvenir store. After the concert, Jan recounts to a happy concertgoer how he and Marla met, and how he has worked every terrible job imaginable, from dishwasher to janitor, to achieve the American dream.

The clarinetist in his band, Mickey (Schwartzman), visits Jan at his gift shop to tell him he wants to quit the band. Jan takes Mickey to a pizza restaurant nearby, urging him to stay, promising more money. Mickey feels that Jan has enlarged the band to an unsustainable size, and reveals that other members are thinking of quitting, especially after a rumor that Jan had hired a dancing bear to accompany the shows. He admits the bear is now part of the act, but insists that better times are ahead. He then picks up a pizza, going out to deliver it.

An elderly couple visits Jan and asks about investing in his band. He explains that they are guaranteed a 12% annual return on their investment. The state Securities and Exchange Commission office discovers Jan is taking on investors and sends investigator Ron Edwards (Smoove) to meet with him. He informs Jan that because he has not registered properly, it is illegal for him to accept investments. He gives Jan three days to return his investors' money and close down.

With hundreds of thousands of dollars already invested, Jan can't meet the SEC deadline. He buys lottery tickets and asks to do more work at the pizza joint. When the elderly couple returns, asking to invest more money with him, Jan changes the corporate name on his forms and takes their money. He tells Edwards that he has officially closed down his first investment scheme, omitting the fact that he has started another.

The film follows Jan as he continues to expand his enterprises. Jan starts a travel company offering European tours. He sells a package that climaxes with a private audience with the Pope. In Rome, he begs Mickey to help him bribe Vatican officials to secure the Papal audience. Realizing he lied to all the tour goers, Mickey threatens to expose Jan, but Jan explains that his philosophy is to simply say his goals out loud until they become true. He encourages Mickey to do the same, and Mickey explains that he has dreamt of creating a stage name for himself. Jan kneels with him in the hotel lobby and dubs him "Mickey Pizzazz".

Thinking that business will increase if Marla wins another beauty pageant, Jan bribes the judges in order to crown her Mrs. Pennsylvania. The ensuing controversy in the press causes some investors to want to withdraw their money or complain to the SEC. A second investigation reveals that Jan's Ponzi scheme has expanded into the millions of dollars. As he is arrested, Jan is exhilarated that God has finally let the truth be known.

Jan is sentenced to five years in prison. His cellmate slashes his throat, and Jan is glad, because he is treated better by everyone after surviving the attack. Marla divorces Jan and he has lost everything. He is released from prison and returns to leading his polka band.

Cast 

 Jack Black as Jan Lewan, Marla's husband and David's father
 Jenny Slate as Marla Lewan, Jan's wife and David's mother
 Jason Schwartzman as Mickey Pizzazz, Jan's best friend
 Jacki Weaver as Barb, Jan's mother-in-law
 Vanessa Bayer as Bitsy Bear
 J. B. Smoove as Ron Edwards, an SEC officer
 Willie Garson as Lonny
 Robert Capron as David Lewan, Jan and Marla's son

Production 
Principal photography on the film began in mid-July 2016 in Pawtucket, Rhode Island, and later it also took place in Woonsocket and Cranston. The movie has been released on Netflix streaming.

Reception 
On review aggregator Rotten Tomatoes, the film holds an approval rating of 66% based on 35 reviews, with an average rating of 6.04/10. The website's critics consensus reads: "Despite moments of hilarity and a talented ensemble, discordant direction and a sloppy script keep The Polka King from truly singing." On Metacritic, the film has a weighted average score of 65 out of 100, based on 11 critics, indicating "generally favorable reviews".

References

External links 
 
 

2017 films
American biographical films
2010s biographical films
American crime comedy films
2010s crime comedy films
Films shot in Rhode Island
Crime films based on actual events
Comedy films based on actual events
Red Hour Productions films
English-language Netflix original films
Polka
Films scored by Theodore Shapiro
Films with screenplays by Wallace Wolodarsky
2017 comedy films
2010s English-language films
2010s American films